Yana Mach'ay (Quechua yana black, mach'ay cave, "black cave", also spelled Yanamachay) is a mountain in the Andes of Peru, about  high. It is located in the Lima Region, Oyón Province, Oyón District, and in the Pasco Region, Pasco Province, Huayllay District.

References

Mountains of Peru
Mountains of Lima Region
Mountains of Pasco Region